Transmetal may refer to:

 Transition metals, a group of elements in the periodic table
 Transmetal (band), a Mexican extreme metal band
 Transmetals, a type of Transformer technology in the fictional Transformers universe
 Transmetal (company), a Mauritian steel trading company